Friday Download was a British children's entertainment television programme, produced by Saltbeef Productions on CBBC. It premiered on 6 May 2011. The final presenting team consisted of Molly Rainford, Anaïs Gallagher, Harvey Cantwell, Akai Osei, Leondre Devries and Charlie Lenehan. The show ran for nine series from 2011 until 2015.

Presenters

Episodes

Tyger vs
Tyger vs was a segment of the Games Download in the first four series, where Tyger went head-to-head against one of the other presenters (or occasionally guests) in either a video or physical game.

Series 1

Series 2

Series 3

Series 4
Due to Drew-Honey not being in the studio for the first two episodes due to other commitments, Danny Pearson (then a guest presenter) took his place.

Face Off
Face Off is a section in the show (introduced in the fifth series) where two of the presenting team go head-to-head in a 'face off' challenge. The loser has to wear a red shirt and stand in the 'danger' zone. The loser of the previous week gets to take on a different presenter the following week, with a chance of stepping out of the danger zone if they win the next challenge. The presenter who is wearing the red shirt at the end of the series has to face a forfeit.

Series 5

Series 6

Christmas Download 2013

Series 7
Face Off presenters includes: Ceallach Spellman, Richard Wisker, Dionne Bromfield, Shannon Flynn, George Sear, Anaïs Gallagher, Harvey Cantwell, Connor Ball, Tinchy Stryder & Austin Mahone

Series 8
Face Off presenters includes: Ceallach Spellman, Shannon Flynn, George Sear, Richard Wisker, Molly Rainford, Anaïs Gallagher, Harvey Cantwell, Akai Osei, Leondre Devries, Charlie Lenehan, Kedar Williams-Sterling, Jordan Brown & Jake Roche

Note: There is no face off in Week 4 due to a special Backstage Radio 1 Teen Awards episode.

Christmas Download 2014

Series 9

There were no new presenters. Those renewed included Anaïs Gallagher and Harvey Cantwell (from series 7 and 8) and Molly Rainford, Akai Osei, Charlie Lenehan and Leondre Devries (from season 8).

Production
Friday Download production as of 2014 is located at The London Studios in Studio 7. The show's production was originally based at BBC Television Centre from 2011 to 2013 and later BBC Elstree Centre in 2013.

Awards and nominations

Notes

External links
 
 Saltbeef Productions website

BBC children's television shows
2010s British children's television series
2011 British television series debuts
2015 British television series endings